Carvel is an American ice cream franchise owned by Focus Brands. Carvel is best known for its soft-serve ice cream and ice cream cakes, which feature a layer of distinctive "crunchies". It also sells a variety of novelty ice cream bars and ice cream sandwiches. Its slogan is "America's Freshest Ice Cream".

Carvel operates a chain of 320 ice cream outlets, mostly concentrated in the Northeast United States and Florida. It has locations across 19 states and Puerto Rico, located in high-traffic areas such as airports, malls, and sports arenas. The company also sells ice cream cakes in more than 8,500 supermarkets.

Since 2001, the corporation has been owned by Roark Capital Group and operated as part of Focus Brands. As of 2020, the Carvel corporate website reports "more than 400 franchise and foodservice locations in more than 20 states and over 10 countries."

Novelty ice creams

Carvel popularized various novelty ice cream items, such as the "Flying Saucer", a circular ice cream sandwich, the "Icy Wycy", a paper cone of sherbet on a stick, "Brown Bonnet" and "Cherry Bonnet," frozen vanilla ice cream on a sugar cone dipped in a sweet, waxy confection, the "Tortoni", a cup of vanilla ice cream covered with toasted coconut and topped with a maraschino cherry, and the "Lollapalooza", cylindrical ice cream on a stick covered with colored sprinkles, as well as the "Mamapalooza" and "Papapalooza".

The mainstays of Carvel's line of ice cream cakes were 7- to 12-inch rounds, 10 x 14 and 12 x 17-inch sheet cakes, and the "Carvelog", a log-shaped cake made in a cylindrical mold. In addition to Cookie Puss, Fudgie the Whale and Hug-Me the Bear, there were special cakes for most major holidays, including a "Flower Basket" for Mother's Day, "Hoot The Owl" for June graduations, "Dumpy the Pumpkin" and "Wicky The Witch" for Halloween, "Tom the Turkey" for Thanksgiving, "Seamus The Leprechaun" or "Cookie O'Puss" for St. Patrick's Day, and Santa Claus or a "Snow Man" for Christmas. Most of these were made from one of a limited number of molds; the Santa Claus cake had a two-pointed hat because the mold was ordinarily inverted and used the rest of the year to make Fudgie the Whale, who had a tail. Their primary differences from products available year-round were the designs on the icing.

Carvel introduced the Lil' Love ice cream cake on March 30, 1998. The commercials, which first appeared in its introduction, show small children in special situations, such as losing a baby tooth, starring in a class play, getting an A in a school class, and getting new glasses (sung to the tune of "Ta-ra-ra Boom-de-ay"). A mother presents the new cake to celebrate. All ads carry the tag line Surprise someone special tonight.

History 

Carvel was founded and operated by Tom Carvel for its first 60 years. In 1929, Carvel borrowed $15 ($ today) from his future wife Agnes and used it to buy and operate an ice cream truck. Over Memorial Day weekend of 1934, Carvel's truck had a flat tire in Hartsdale, New York. Carvel sold his custard at the site of the breakdown. Within two days Carvel had sold his entire stock, much of it partly melted. He realized that a fixed location and soft (as opposed to hard) frozen desserts were good business ideas. In his first year, he grossed over $3,500. By 1937 he had a custard stand at the Hartsdale site, with a freezer which allowed him to make his own frozen custard. By 1939, gross was over $6,000.

In the early 1940s, Tom Carvel traveled, selling custard at carnivals, while his wife Agnes ran the Hartsdale location. During World War II he ran the ice cream stands at Fort Bragg in North Carolina, gaining expertise in refrigeration technology. He invented and patented a freezer, the "Custard King", and in 1947 sold 71 freezers at $2,900 each. Some freezer purchasers defaulted on payments on the units. Upon investigation, Carvel found that they were running their businesses inefficiently, choosing poor locations and not always maintaining high health standards. Carvel decided that the best course was to participate in running the operations of his freezer customers. He later claimed this led him to develop the concept of franchising.

Franchising and advertising
In 1949, Carvel began franchising under the name "Carvel Dari-Freez". By the early 1950s, the company had over 50 stores. New franchisees undertook an 18-day training program at the "Carvel College of Ice Cream Knowledge", and were sent an in-house magazine called "The Shopper's Road". In addition Carvel provided building plans for franchises, which were initially stand-alone glass fronted stores.

In 1955, Tom Carvel began to record his own radio commercials. An unsubstantiated anecdote relates that he was driving in New York City, and heard a commercial for a new Carvel's store which did not mention the new store's location. Convinced he could do better, he drove to the radio station and did the next commercial himself. True or not, from 1955 onwards, Carvel recorded nearly all of the chain's advertising, eventually maintaining an in-house production studio at the headquarters offices, and becoming something of a regional celebrity.

Carvel's commercials stood out and raised brand awareness primarily through their lack of sophistication. Carvel had a distinctive "gravelly" voice, lacking the "slick" sound of most professional voice-over artists, and all his narration was unrehearsed. His wording was conversational, with commercials frequently ending with the words "Thank You". Television commercials, aired primarily in the "tri-state area" of New York, New Jersey and Connecticut, began in 1971. Accompanied by the familiar Tom Carvel narration, footage showed the products, and employees in the stores; very few graphics or effects were used.

Promotions were part of Carvel's practices from their earliest days. In 1936, they had a "Buy One Get One Free" promotion, and in later years had various contests. They were an early adopter of corporate sponsorship of various events and tie-in promotions, including a tie-in with the New York Yankees. A long-running and well-known campaign was the "Wednesday is Sundae at Carvel!" discount.

Further developments

In 1956, Carvel transformed the Hartsdale location into their first "Ice Cream Supermarket" by adding freezer cases containing pre-made cakes and novelty items which customers could choose and purchase. In 1955, Carvel began its "lease back land offer" program, in which a potential investor could buy land, build a franchise, then lease it back to the corporation.

Carvel experimented with various ice cream vehicle options for most of its early history. Vehicle concepts included a scooter (circa 1957) and a custom truck, the "Carvehicle", for which they applied for several patents (circa 1958).

A dispute with franchisees came to a head in 1962. Independent owners attempted to buy products from outside the corporate supply chain (in conflict with their contracts), maintaining that the company was deliberately overcharging them. Carvel argued that the franchisees were trying to use inferior ingredients. As well as the immediate impact on corporate cash flow, this hurt the corporate image, reducing the chain to 175 stores. When the corporation tried to enforce this contract, the Federal Trade Commission sued them for restraint of trade. Legal proceedings reached the Supreme Court of the United States in 1964, with the corporation emerging victorious.

In 1967, the corporation bought the Westchester Town House Motel, on Tuckahoe Road in Yonkers, New York and renamed it the Carvel Inn, converting it for use as corporate headquarters, while still operating it as a hotel, providing them with a conference center for the annual franchisee conventions.

During the late 1970s, Carvel attempted to distinguish itself from other purveyors of soft-serve ice cream by claiming that its ice cream machines did not infuse the product with air, unlike the competition. During the 1970s, when dieting and fitness became more popular, Carvel began offering a low-fat frozen dessert called Thinny-Thin ("Thinny-Thin, for your fatty-fat friends"), and a frozen yogurt product called Lo-Yo. From 1973 to 1975, Carvel published a promotional comic book.

In 1983, Saturday Night Live parodied Carvel's ad campaigns during its season 9 episode 7 show, with Joe Piscopo portraying Tom Carvel becoming increasingly troubled by a franchisee's line of X-rated Christmas cakes shaped like breasts, buttocks, testicles and penises. The same year, the Beastie Boys released their first single, Cooky Puss, which included audio of the rap band making prank phone calls to a Carvel store.

By 1985, there were 865 stores with an income of over $300 million.

In the late 1980s and early 1990s, Howard Stern used a vocal harmonizer to imitate the "outer space" voice of Cookie Puss that was used in Carvel's TV advertisements. Stern also made frequent references to longtime co-worker Fred Norris's cluelessness and cheapness in having once given his mother a Cookie Puss cake as a Mother's Day gift.

In 1989, an aging Tom Carvel sold the corporation to Investcorp for $80 million. In 1991, its headquarters was moved to Farmington, Connecticut. On December 11, 2001, Roark Capital Group, a private equity firm, purchased a controlling interest in Carvel Corporation from Investcorp. Investcorp became a minority share holder.  

Carvel was for most of its history a regional business, most strongly based on the east coast of the United States. As the business climate has changed, so has some of the focus of the brand. There are, as of 2018, approximately 418 retail franchises and food service locations, far fewer than at its peak. Carvel branded products are available in approximately 9,500 supermarkets. Celebration Foods has pushed the brand's presence from 30 states in 2004 to 49 in 2008, allowing them to form merchandising partnerships with national brands, such as ice cream cakes featuring Mars' M&M's characters. Focus Brands is based in Atlanta, Georgia, Celebration Foods is based in New Britain, Connecticut.  

In August 2007, Abdul Faghihi, the owner of the original Carvel location in Hartsdale revealed that he had applied for permission to knock down the store and develop a retail strip on the property. The Hartsdale store was closed on October 5, 2008. In March 2009, the store was demolished to make way for a Japanese restaurant. 

In 2015, Carvel started to open co-branded stores with Auntie Anne's and Cinnabon.

 there were 371 Carvel franchises worldwide, with 324 in the US.

See also
 List of dairy product companies in the United States
 List of frozen custard companies

References

External links

 Official website
 Smithsonian Institution Carvel archives page
 Washington Post video tour of Carvel archives
 Hoovers Company Factsheet

Companies based in Hartford County, Connecticut
Economy of the Eastern United States
Regional restaurant chains in the United States
Dairy products companies of the United States
Restaurants established in 1929
Ice cream parlors in the United States
Frozen custard
American companies established in 1929
Ice cream brands
Farmington, Connecticut
1929 establishments in New York (state)
2001 mergers and acquisitions